Bledar Vashaku (born 8 November 1981 in Elbasan) is an Albanian retired footballer who played as a goalkeeper.

Club career

Partizani Tirana
Vashaku joined Partizani Tirana in the Albanian Superliga on 25 August 2015, as backup to Albania international goalkeeper Alban Hoxha alongside Dashamir Xhika. He played his first and last match with the team on 16 September 2015, playing full-90 minutes in a 0–5 away win over Korabi Peshkopi, match valid for the first leg of the first round of Albanian Cup.

He left the club on 5 January 2016 after terminated his contract by mutual consensus.

References 

1981 births
Living people
Footballers from Elbasan
Albanian footballers
Association football goalkeepers
KF Naftëtari Kuçovë players
KF Apolonia Fier players
KF Laçi players
KF Elbasani players
KF Teuta Durrës players
Besa Kavajë players
KF Tirana players
FC Kamza players
FK Tomori Berat players
FK Partizani Tirana players
KS Turbina Cërrik players
KF Adriatiku Mamurrasi players
KS Sopoti Librazhd players
Kategoria Superiore players
Kategoria e Parë players